Aakanksha Singh (born 30 July ) is an Indian actress who primarily works in Telugu and Hindi films and television. She started her career with theatre and made her acting debut with the television series Na Bole Tum Na Maine Kuch Kaha (2012–2014). She made her film debut with Badrinath Ki Dulhania (2017). 

Singh made her Telugu film debut with Malli Raava (2017), for which she received SIIMA Award for Best Female Debut – Telugu nomination. Post this, she earned success with the Telugu film Devadas (2018), Kannada film Pailwaan (2019) and Hindi film Runway 34 (2022). She has been part of web series including, Rangbaaz: Darr Ki Rajneeti and Meet Cute (both 2022).

Singh is a recipient of an Indian Telly Award. In addition to her acting career, Singh is a prominent celebrity endorser for brands and products.

Early and personal life
Singh was born on 30 July in Jaipur, Rajasthan. Her mother is a theatre artist. She completed her schooling from Ryan International School and is a physiotherapist by education.

She married her longtime boyfriend Kunal Sain, a marketing professional, in 2014 in Rajasthan.

Career

Initial television career (2012–2017) 

Singh made her acting debut in 2012 with the television show Na Bole Tum Na Maine Kuch Kaha. She portrayed Megha Vyas Bhatnagar, a widow with two children opposite Kunal Karan Kapoor. She won Indian Telly Award for Fresh New Face - Female for her performance. The show ended in 2013, with two seasons.

She next appeared in the finite series, Gulmohar Grand in 2015. The show based on the hotel industry saw her portraying Anahita "Annie" Mehta Fernandez. Singh has also been part of Box Cricket League for the team Ahmedabad Express in 2016. In 2017, she played a lawyer in an episode of Aye Zindagi.

Film debut and further career (2017–present) 
Singh made her film debut with the Hindi film Badrinath Ki Dulhania in 2017. In the same year she made her Telugu debut with Malli Raava opposite Sumanth. It received mixed to positive reviews and she got nominated with SIIMA Award for Best Female Debut – Telugu for her performance.

In 2018, she appeared in her second Telugu film Devadas opposite Nagarjuna. It received positive reviews and was a commercial success. The same year, she appeared in two short films Methi Ke Laddoo and Qaid.

Singh marked her Kannada film debut with the 2019 film Pailwaan opposite Sudeep. It was released in 5 languages and was an average hit at the box office.

In 2021, she made her web debut with the Telugu web series Parampara. It premiered on Disney+ Hotstar.

Singh made her Tamil debut in 2022 with the Tamil-Telugu bilingual film, Clap opposite Aadhi Pinisetty. It released on SonyLIV platform. She next appeared in the Tamil film Veerapandiyapuram which received negative reviews.

She next played Ajay Devgn's wife in the Hindi film Runway 34, which marks her second Hindi project. It received mixed to positive reviews. She portrayed a cop in her first Hindi web series Escaype Live on Disney+ Hotstar.

Singh will next appeared in the Hindi web series Rangbaaz: Darr Ki Rajneeti opposite Viineet Kumar. She has also appeared in the Telugu film Meet Cute, an anthology produced by Nani.

In the media

Singh ranked 12th in Times of India's Bangalore Times 30 Most Desirable Women of 2019.

Filmography

Films

Television

Web series

Awards and nominations

References

External links

 
 

1990 births
Living people
Indian television actresses
Indian soap opera actresses
Actresses from Jaipur
Actresses in Hindi television
21st-century Indian actresses
Actresses in Telugu cinema
Actresses in Hindi cinema